Emil Abaz (born 17 January 1998) is a Macedonian professional footballer who plays for Rupel Boom in the Belgian National Division 1. He also holds Belgian citizenship.

Club career
Born in Skopje, he played with Beerschot A.C. before joining the youth team of Belgian club R.S.C. Anderlecht in 2013. He played for Anderlecht in the semi-finals of the 2015–16 UEFA Youth League against Chelsea.

In summer 2016 he signed with Croatian club GNK Dinamo Zagreb. Abaz played for Dinamo in the 2016–17 UEFA Youth League and with Dinamo Zagreb II in the 2016–17 Croatian Second League.

In January 2017, during the winter-break, he left Dinamo Zagreb and signed with Serbian club FK Spartak Subotica. He made his debut in the 2016–17 Serbian SuperLiga in the 26th round played on 12 March 2017, in an away game against FK Rad, a 3–0 defeat. At the beginning of 2018, Abaz mutually terminated the contract with Spartak, and left the club as a free agent.

International career
As a Romani born in Skopje, he represented initially Belgium where he was living, playing for Belgium U-16.  Then he switched and started playing for Macedonia. He made appearances for Macedonia U-17 and U-19 national teams.

On 24 March 2017, he made his debut for the Macedonia U-21 national team, entering the game in the 69th minute as a substitute for the captain Petar Petkovski, in a friendly match against Montenegro U-21 that Macedonia won with 2–0.

References

External links

1998 births
Living people
Footballers from Skopje
Macedonian footballers
North Macedonia youth international footballers
Belgian footballers
Belgium youth international footballers
Belgian people of Macedonian descent
Belgian Romani people
Macedonian Romani people
Romani footballers
Association football forwards
R.S.C. Anderlecht players
GNK Dinamo Zagreb II players
FK Spartak Subotica players
K Beerschot VA players
FK Borec players
K. Rupel Boom F.C. players
First Football League (Croatia) players
Serbian SuperLiga players
Macedonian First Football League players
Challenger Pro League players
Macedonian expatriate footballers
Expatriate footballers in Serbia
Macedonian expatriate sportspeople in Serbia
Expatriate footballers in Croatia
Macedonian expatriate sportspeople in Croatia
Expatriate footballers in Belgium
Macedonian expatriate sportspeople in Belgium